Glauconite is an iron potassium phyllosilicate (mica group) mineral of characteristic green color which is very friable and has very low weathering resistance.

It crystallizes with a monoclinic geometry. Its name is derived from the Greek  meaning 'bluish green', referring to the common blue-green color of the mineral; its sheen (mica glimmer) and blue-green color. Its color ranges from olive green, black green to bluish green, and yellowish on exposed surfaces due to oxidation. In the Mohs scale it has hardness of 2. The relative specific gravity range is 2.4 - 2.95. It is normally found as dark green rounded concretions with the dimensions of a sand grain. It can be confused with chlorite (also of green color) or with a clay mineral. Glauconite has the chemical formula .

Glauconite particles are one of the main components of greensand, glauconitic siltstone and glauconitic sandstone. Glauconite has been called a marl in an old and broad sense of that word. Thus references to "greensand marl" sometimes refer specifically to glauconite. The Glauconitic Marl formation is named after it, and there is a glauconitic sandstone formation in the Mannville Group of Western Canada.

Occurrence 
At the broadest level, glauconite is an authigenic mineral and forms exclusively in marine settings. It is commonly associated with low-oxygen conditions.

Normally, glauconite is considered a diagnostic mineral indicative of continental shelf marine depositional environments with slow rates of accumulation and gradational boundaries.  For instance, it appears in Jurassic/lower Cretaceous deposits of greensand, so-called after the coloration caused by glauconite, its presence gradually lessening further landward. It can also be found in sand or clay formations, or in impure limestones and in chalk. It develops as a consequence of diagenetic alteration of sedimentary deposits, bio-chemical reduction and subsequent mineralogical changes affecting iron-bearing micas such as biotite, and is also influenced by the decaying process of organic matter degraded by bacteria in marine animal shells. Glauconite forms under reducing conditions in sediments and such deposits are commonly found in nearshore sands, open oceans and the Mediterranean Sea. Glauconite remains absent in fresh-water lakes, but is noted in shelf sediments of the western Black Sea. The wide distribution of these sandy deposits was first made known by naturalists on board the fifth HMS Challenger, in the expedition of 1872–1876.

Uses
Glauconite has long been used in Europe as a green pigment for artistic oil paint under the name green earth. One example is its use in Russian "icon paintings", another widespread use was for underpainting of human flesh in medieval painting. It is also found as mineral pigment in wall paintings from the ancient Roman Gaul.

Fertilizers 
Glauconite, a major component of greensand, is a common source of potassium (K+) in plant fertilizers and is also used to adjust soil pH. It is used for soil conditioning in both organic and non-organic farming, whether as an unprocessed material (mixed in adequate proportions) or as a feedstock in the synthesis of commercial fertilizer powders. In Brazil, greensand refers to a fertilizer produced from a glauconitic siltstone unit belonging to the Serra da Saudade Formation, Bambuí Group, of Neoproterozoic/Ediacaran age. The outcrops occur in the Serra da Saudade ridge, in the Alto Paranaíba region, Minas Gerais state. It is a silty-clayed sedimentary rock, laminated, bluish-green, composed of glauconite (40-80%), potassium feldspar (10-15%), quartz (10-60%), muscovite (5%) and minor quantities of biotite (2%), goethite (<1%), titanium and manganese oxides (<1%), barium phosphate and rare-earth element phosphates (<1%).

Enriched levels of potash have K2O grades between 8 and 12%, thickness up to 50 m and are associated to the glauconitic levels, dark-green in color. Glauconite is authigenic and highly mature. The high concentration of this mineral is related to a depositional environment with a low sedimentation rate. The glauconitic siltstone has resulted from a high-level flooding event in the Bambuí Basin. The sedimentary provenance is from supracrustal felsic elements in a continental margin environment with acid magmatic arc (foreland basin).

References

Potassium minerals
Sodium minerals
Magnesium minerals
Aluminium minerals
Iron(III) minerals
Mica group
Monoclinic minerals
Minerals in space group 12
Inorganic pigments